Events in the year 1654 in Norway.

Incumbents
Monarch: Frederick III

Events
The Løkken Mine, the largest deposits of pyrite in Norway starts to operate, it is operated from 1654 to 1987.
 The last bubonic plague outbreaks in Norway occur.

Arts and literature

Births

Deaths

Lorentz Lossius, founder of the Røros Copper Works (born in Germany c.1600).

See also

References